Abbas Ramzi Attaie was an Iranian rear admiral and Commander of Imperial Iranian Navy from 1972 to 1975.

References

External links
 Harvard Iranian Oral History Project - Interview Date: 11 June 1985
 
 

Commanders of Imperial Iranian Navy
Possibly living people
Year of birth missing
Imperial Iranian Navy rear admirals